HD 125612 b is an extrasolar planet which orbits the G-type main sequence star HD 125612, located approximately 188 light years away in the constellation Virgo. This planet was detected using the doppler spectroscopy method and the discovery was first announced in a paper submitted to the arXiv preprint repository on April 10, 2007.

References

External links
 

Exoplanets discovered in 2007
Giant planets
Virgo (constellation)
Exoplanets detected by radial velocity